The World Group Play-offs were the main play-offs of 2004 Davis Cup. Winners advanced to the World Group, and loser were relegated in the Zonal Regions I.

Teams
Bold indicates team has qualified for the 2005 Davis Cup World Group.

 From World Group

 From Americas Group I

 From Asia/Oceania Group I

 From Europe/Africa Group I

Results

Seeded teams
 
 
 
 
 
 
 
 

Unseeded teams

 
 
 
 
 
  
 
 

Playoff results

Australia vs. Morocco

Chile vs. Japan

Croatia vs. Belgium

Paraguay vs. Czech Republic

Slovakia vs. Germany

Austria vs. Great Britain

Romania vs. Canada

Russia vs. Thailand

References

World Group Play-offs